Archery at the 1983 Southeast Asian Games was held at Nanyang Technological Institute Field from June 1 to June 4, 1983.

Medalists

Recurve

Medal table

References

Archery at the Southeast Asian Games
1983 Southeast Asian Games events
1983 in archery
International archery competitions hosted by Singapore